Karen Martini (born 20 September 1971) is an Australian chef, restaurateur, writer and television presenter.

Early life 
Martini was born in Greensborough, Victoria and is now living in Melbourne who began cooking at a young age. At 15 she undertook work experience including under veteran French-Australian chef Jacques Reymond, before learning classical skills from Tansy Good at her eponymous restaurant in Melbourne. Later during the nineties, Martini held positions at Haskin's and the Kent Hotel, before Melbourne Wine Room in St Kilda's George Hotel. Martini is married to Michael Sapountsis and has a daughter named Stella who was born in 2006.

Television and media
She is best known for her television role as food chef on Better Homes and Gardens and Judge on My Kitchen Rules. In 2005 Martini was the resident chef on LifeStyle Cafe, a 13-part series on the LifeStyle Channel. She was also one of the chefs on Intolerant Cooks.

See also

References

Australian restaurateurs
Women restaurateurs
Australian food writers
Australian television presenters
Australian television chefs
Living people
1971 births
Place of birth missing (living people)
Women chefs
Australian women television presenters
My Kitchen Rules
People from Greensborough, Victoria
Television personalities from Melbourne